The Galerie Georges-Philippe et Nathalie Vallois is a contemporary art gallery owned by Georges-Philippe and Nathalie Vallois and is located in Paris, France.

In addition to recent contemporary art, the gallery also specializes in works by Nouveaux réalistes such as Arman, César or Jacques Villeglé.

Since 2022, Georges-Philippe Vallois has been serving on the selection committee of Art Basel's Paris edition.

Artists
Exhibited artists include:

References

External links
Galerie Vallois official website
Galerie Vallois Time Out Paris
Georges-Philippe Vallois (Art Dealer) (Paris Art) 
Galerie Profile on ArtSlant
La galerie Georges-Philippe et Nathalie Vallois (Le Figaro) 

Contemporary art galleries in France
Art museums and galleries in Paris